Medze Parish is an administrative unit of South Kurzeme Municipality in the Courland region of Latvia. The parish has a population of 1558 (as of 1/07/2010) and covers an area of 109.2 km2.

Parish center - Kapsēde.

Villages of Medze parish 
 Ievkalni
 Kapsēde
 Medzes muiža
 Piņķi
 Plienkalni (Kapsēdes stacija)
 Stirnas
 Šķēde
 Tāši

History

Medzes parish was formed around 1900. In 2009 Medzes parish was included in the administrative Grobiņa Municipality.

Parishes of Latvia
South Kurzeme Municipality
Courland